Gabriel Francis Piemonte (January 28, 1909 in Boston, Massachusetts – June 30, 1991 in Boston, Massachusetts) was an American attorney and politician who was a member of the Massachusetts House of Representatives from 1947 to 1952  and the Boston City Council from 1952 to 1960, 1962 to 1964, 1966 to 1968, and 1970 to 1974. In 1952 and from 1970 to 1972 he was the Council President.

He was an unsuccessful candidate for Suffolk County District Attorney in 1954, Mayor of Boston in 1959 and 1963 and Governor of Massachusetts in 1960.

Gabriel Piemonte was married to Evelyn Penta, and had four children; one son and three daughters.

See also
 Massachusetts legislature: 1947–1948, 1949–1950, 1951–1952

References

1909 births
1991 deaths
Democratic Party members of the Massachusetts House of Representatives
Boston City Council members
Lawyers from Boston
Suffolk University Law School alumni
20th-century American politicians
20th-century American lawyers